The 1996 Kentucky Derby was the 122nd running of the Kentucky Derby. The race took place on May 4, 1996. There were 142,668 in attendance. The loss by 7-2 favorite Unbridled's Song marked the 17th year in a row that the betting favorite failed to win the race. The winning horse Grindstone was sired by another Kentucky Derby winner, Unbridled.

Payout
The 122nd Kentucky Derby Payout Schedule

 $2 Exacta: (2-12)  Paid   $61.80
 $2 Trifecta: (2-12-7)  Paid   $600.60
 $1 Superfecta: (2-12-7-3)  Paid   $5,844.20

Full results

References

1996
Kentucky Derby
Derby
Kentucky
Kentucky Derby